The Algiers Metro is a rapid transit system that serves Algiers, the capital of  Algeria. Originally designed in the 1970s, it opened in 2011 after decades of delays due to financial difficulties and security issues. The Algiers Metro was the second metro system to open in Africa, after the Cairo Metro.

A  extension from "Haï el Badr" to "El Harrach Centre" opened for commercial service on 4 July 2015 after test runs in June.

History
 

During the 1970s, the promoters of the Algiers rapid transit subway project envisioned a  network. The project was officially inaugurated in 1982, with technical studies completed in 1985.  Authorities retained a German company and a Japanese specialist for building the network. The collapse of oil prices in the 1980s considerably affected the Algerian state's ability to continue funding the project. Authorities discussed the possibility of folding the subway development programme into other mass-transit projects but eventually decided to continue with the original Metro program, albeit slowly.

In 1988–89, Algeria awarded construction contracts to two national companies: COSIDER and GENISIDER. Neither was experienced in running large urban transit development projects. Construction encountered financial and political difficulties, with only four stations being constructed in 15 years. Moreover, the Algiers soil is difficult to dig in, and the city's topography is irregular. Work did not advance significantly for many years.

Another  section, connecting the Central Post Office to Khélifa-Boukhalfa, was completed soon after. In 1999, the Metro of Algiers Company (EMA) invited international companies to participate in a tender offering, resulting in two new contractors being added to the project: French Systra-Sgte for project management, and Agéro-German GAAMA for construction and completion, within 38 months, of the civil engineering tasks and earthworks.

In 2003, benefiting from the return of economic stability and improved security, the government increased funding and introduced a new organisational and operational structure.

In January 2006, further changes were introduced to the project, with integrated systems development handed to Siemens Transportation Systems. This included the installation of fixed material, signals and electrification. Vinci was responsible for civil engineering, and the Spanish company Construcciones y Auxiliar de Ferrocarriles (CAF) was to deliver a new set of rolling stock, including 14 trains of 6 cars each. The network would use the Trainguard MT CBTC technology, which had already been implemented on line 1 and line 14 of the Paris Métro.

System 
Only the Haï El Badr terminus station is on the surface and it has three tracks and two island platforms.
 The El Hamma - Haï El Badr section, with its 4 stations and 17 other works for ventilation and cables was carried out within 38 months. Civil engineering work and rail laying were officially completed on 30 June 2007.

Stations

Operations

The total cost of the first phase of line 1 rose to 77 billion DZD (900 million euros), consisting of DZD 30 billion for civil engineering and DZD 47 billion for the equipment.
 14 six-car trains are being used. Each train is 108m in length with 208 seats and can transport 1,216 people.
 The metro line can move 41,000 passengers per hour, the equivalent of 150 million passengers per year, with a headway of under 2 minutes.
 The metro's daily operation is the responsibility of the RATP Group, which was awarded the contract in August 2007.

Extensions

It opened for public service on 4 July 2015.

 The Gaama group which carried out the first section quoted 250 million euros including the construction of a multimodal station (subway/train/taxis) at the El Harrach railway station.

Two other extensions to Line 1 had a planned public opening in 2017:
 a branch line from Haï El Badr to Aïn Naâdja.
 an extension north from Tafourah Grande Poste to Place des Martyrs

Network map

See also 

 Algeria
 Algiers Tram
 List of metro systems
 Transport in Algeria

References

External links

 Interactive Algiers Metro Map
 Algiers Metro
 L'Etablissement de Transport Urbain et Suburbain d’Alger (ETUSA)
 Siemens Transportation Systems - Algiers Metro
 Subways.net Algiers Metro
 UrbanRail.Net – descriptions of all metro systems in the world, each with a schematic map showing all stations.

 
Electric railways in Algeria
Rail transport in Algeria
Railway lines opened in 2011
Rail transport articles in need of updating
RATP Group
Siemens Mobility projects
Metro
Underground rapid transit in Algeria
2011 establishments in Algeria